Carlos Garaikoetxea Urriza (born 2 June 1938) is a former politician from the Spanish Basque Country. He became the second elected Lehendakari (President of the Basque Autonomous Community), after José Antonio Aguirre, who had held that office in 1936-60.

Early life 
He was a leading figure in the Basque Nationalist Party (EAJ-PNV) of Navarre in the period 1975-80. In 1979, he was elected president of the Basque General Council, the provisional body preparing the devolution of powers to the Basque Country prior to the approval of the Statute of Autonomy. Once approved, Garaikoetxea was elected Lehendakari in 1980 and reelected in 1984.

During his presidency the Basque Statute of Autonomy was developed. As Lehendakari, Garaikoetxea inaugurated the radio-television public broadcast service EiTB on 31 December 1982. During his term, important self-government institutions were created: the Basque Public Health System (Osakidetza) and the Ertzaintza, the Basque police service, which was directed by his close collaborator Juan Porres Azkona from 1982 until 1986. During the floods of August 1983, he managed both Basque and Spanish emergency services in order to solve the resulting problems. The economy recovered through the revision of the Basque "Concierto Económico" and the Basque language was established throughout the Basque education system.

In 1985 nevertheless, major divergences with the direction of his party (Law of Historical Territories, personal clash with the president of the Basque Nationalist Party, Xabier Arzalluz, expulsion of all the organization in Navarre) created a major split within EAJ-PNV and Garaikoetxea, leading one of the factions (with greater support in Gipuzkoa, Navarre and Vitoria-Gasteiz, but not in Biscay nor the Araban countryside), he was replaced by José Antonio Ardanza in 1985. Soon after, the breach inside the party was complete and Eusko Alkartasuna was founded, with Garaikoetxea becoming its president and candidate to the Basque Presidency, a role that he held until 1999, when he retired from politics. He was elected as deputy in the Basque Parliament in all successive elections until 1998. He was also a Member of the European Parliament from 1987 to 1991.

See also
 Spanish transition to democracy
 Statute of Autonomy of the Basque Country

References

External links

1938 births
Basque history
Basque Nationalist Party MEPs
Basque politics
Eusko Alkartasuna Party politicians
Leaders of political parties in Spain
Living people
Members of the 1st Basque Parliament
Members of the 2nd Basque Parliament
Members of the 3rd Basque Parliament
Members of the 4th Basque Parliament
Members of the 5th Basque Parliament
Members of the 6th Basque Parliament
MEPs for Spain 1987–1989
MEPs for Spain 1989–1994
People from Pamplona
Presidents of the Basque Government
Politicians from Navarre
University of Deusto alumni